Roland Baron Fitzgerald (died 1561) was a Roman Catholic prelate who served as Archbishop of Cashel (1553–1561).

Biography
In 1553, Roland Baron Fitzgerald was appointed during the papacy of Pope Julius III as Archbishop of Cashel.
In Dec 1553, he was consecrated bishop. 
He served as Archbishop of Cashel until his death on 28 October 1561.

References 

16th-century Roman Catholic archbishops in Ireland
Bishops appointed by Pope Julius III
1561 deaths
Archbishops of Cashel
Post-Reformation Roman Catholic bishops in Ireland